An Iron Eagle is an American military officer who has attained the rank of colonel but will not be promoted to the rank of general.  The term refers to the rank insignia a colonel wears, which resembles an eagle.  

There are several reasons an officer may become an Iron Eagle.  Administratively, certain occupational specialties are not structured to permit promotion to general without changing to a different career path.  Other officers, for political or disciplinary reasons, shall never be promoted to general.  Such officers sometimes retire, but others remain in the military for the full thirty years, until the service limitations of their current rank force their retirement.

Military slang and jargon